Miss Earth 2003, the 3rd edition of the Miss Earth pageant, was held on November 9, 2003, at the University of the Philippines Theater in Quezon City, Philippines. Fifty-seven delegates from all over the globe participated in the event. The pageant was broadcast live via ABS-CBN in the Philippines and to many countries worldwide via Star World, The Filipino Channel and other partner networks. Winfred Omwakwe from Kenya crowned her successor Dania Prince of Honduras the end of the event. Brazil's Pricila Zandona was selected Miss Air 2003 (first runner-up), Costa Rica's Marianela Zeledon Bolanos was chosen Miss Water 2003 (second runner-up), and Poland's Marta Matyjasik was Miss Fire 2003 (third runner-up). The pageant was hosted by Television show host Ariel Ureta. The candidates were initially presented at the poolside of Hotel Intercontinental Manila in Makati on October 22, 2003.

Beauty for a Cause Award was awarded to Vida Samadzai the first Afghan woman to compete in an international beauty pageant in almost three decades, for helping found a US-based women's charity that seeks to raise awareness of women's rights and education in Afghanistan by "symbolizing the newfound confidence, courage and spirit of today’s women and representing the victory of women’s rights and various social, personal and religious struggles".

Results

Placements

Air — 1st Runner-Up, 

Water — 2nd Runner-Up

Fire — 3rd Runner-Up

Special awards

Order of announcements

Top 10

Top 4

Winning answer
Final Question in Miss Earth 2003: "At the end of each rainbow, so the saying goes, is a pot of gold. As a woman of the earth, instead of a pot of gold, what else would you rather find at the end of the rainbow?"

Winning Answer of Miss Earth 2003: "Honestly, there are things that are much more important than gold. For me personally, the most important is the sentiments of the people. To give love and smile to a human being, to be able to give them a hand when needed, to give help to someone who needs your presence, and also God is always with us which is very important. The first thing I think when I open my eyes is heaven. When we have Him in our hearts and mind, everything is better. And I can see people how they really are inside, not if they have gold or not. For me the rainbow means life, God and happiness." - Dania Prince, represented Honduras.

Judges
The following is the list of the nine-member board of judges of Miss Earth 2003:

Contestants
List of countries/territories and delegates that participated in Miss Earth 2003:

  - Vida Samadzai
  - Juany Gomez
  - Marisol Pipastrelli
  - Shivaune Christina Field
  - Sofie Ydens
  - Claudia Cecilia Azaeda Melgar
  - Mirela Bulbulija
  - Priscila Poleselo Zandoná
  - Brooke Elizabeth Johnston
  - Carolina Salazar
  - Dong Meixi
  - Emily de Castro Giacometto
  - Marianela Zeledón Bolaños
  - Krystiana Aristotelou
  - Marie Petersen
  - Suanny Frontaán
  - Isabel Cristina Ontaneda Pinto
  - Kadi Tombak
  - Yodit Getahun
  - Jenni Suominen
  - Jennifer Pichard
  - Jolena Kwasow
  - Ama Amissah Quartey
  - Justine Olivero
  - Marie Claire Palacios Boeufgras
  - Dania Prince
  - Aniko Szucs
  - Shwetha Vijay Nair
  - Moran Glistron
  - Asami Saito
  - Hazel Nzioki
  - Yoo-mi Oh
  - Teuta Hoxha
  - Mary Georges Hanna
  - Ying Ying Lee
  - Lorena Irene Velarde Briceño
  - Katey Ellen Price
  - Marynés Argüello César
  - Eva Ogberor
  - Fay Larsen
  - Jessica Doralis Segui Barrios †
  - Danitza Autero Stanic
  - Laura Marie Dunlap
  - Marta Matyjasik
  - Norelis Ortiz Acosta
  - Katarina Vucetic
  - Adele Koh
  - Sabina Begovic
  - Catherine Constantinides
  - Caroline Sonath
  - Catherine Waldenmeyer
  - Vairupe Pater Huioutu
  - Anongnat Sutthanuch
  - Diana Starkova
  - Jessica Schilling †
  - Driva Ysabella Cedeño Salazar
  - Nguyễn Ngân Hà

Notes

Debuts

Replacements
  is technically new, as it was designated in the previous years as "Yugoslavia".

Withdrawals

Returns
Last competed in 2001:

Other notes
 : Won Miss Talent for two years in a row.
 : Dania Prince also competed at Miss Universe in 1998. She was unplaced in Hawaii and the pageant was won by Wendy Fitzwilliam. Then, she became the first Honduran woman to win Miss Earth in the Philippines 5 years later.
 : On September 27, 2010, Jessica Segui died in a Panamanian Hospital due to cerebral aneurysm.
 ': On November 27, 2003, Jessica Schilling died at the age of 19 in a car crash in Palm Springs, California.

Further reading
 Newsweek: Kuntzman, Gersh.American Beat: Beauty is a Beast. Published on November 3, 2003. Retrieved December 27, 2009
 Milwaukee Journal Sentinel: Associated Press. Miss Afghanistan wins award at Miss Earth contest. Published on November 10, 2003. Retrieved December 27, 2009
 Los Angeles Times: Main News. Justice Official Criticizes Beauty Contestant. Published on November 9, 2003. Retrieved December 27, 2009
 Sky News United Kingdom: Bikini Beauty Queen Faces Backlash. Published on November 10, 2003. Retrieved December 27, 2009
 Rediff India: Agencies. Miss Afghanistan is 'beauty for a cause' Published on November 10, 2003. Retrieved December 27, 2009
 Deseret News: The Salt Lake City, UT First Afghan in three decades to take part in a beauty pageant. Published on November 9, 2003. November 9, 2003 Retrieved December 27, 2009
 The Tribune- Pittsburg: The Associated Press. Beauty's bikini agitates Afghan prosecutors. Published on November 9, 2003. November 9, 2003. Retrieved December 27, 2009
 Philadelphia Daily News: Online News. Uh oh! Miss Afghanistan broke the law?. Published on November 9, 2003. November 10, 2003. Retrieved December 27, 2009
 The Sunday Register Guard: Eugene, Oregon. Red bikini catches Afghans' attention. Published on November 9, 2003. Retrieved December 27, 2009
 Bangor Daily News- Washington. Associated Press. Miss Afghanistan wins beauty contest award. Published on November 9, 2003. Retrieved December 27, 2009
 New Straits Times: Associated Press. Miss Afghanistan Wins Special Award In Miss Earth Pageant. Published on November 11, 2003. Retrieved December 27, 2009
 The Spokesman-Review: Fowler, Jonathan. Miss Afghanistan faces charges if she returns. Published on November 10, 2003. Retrieved December 27, 2009
 Xinhua News Agency: chinaview.cn: Miss Afghanistan stirs criticism from home country. Published on October 207, 2003. Retrieved December 27, 2009
 The Indian Express: Constable, Pamela .Barely bearable. Published on November 2, 2003. Retrieved December 27, 2009
 The Toronto Star: De Castro, Erik/Reuters. Afghanistan Top court censures expatriate beauty pageant. Published on November 2, 2003. Retrieved December 27, 2009
 The Washington Post/Island Packet'': Woman's Appearance In Pageant Sparks Debate. Published on October 31, 2003. Retrieved December 27, 2009

References

External links
 
 Miss Earth Foundation
 Miss Earth Foundation Kids' I Love My Planet

2003
2003 in the Philippines
2003 beauty pageants
Beauty pageants in the Philippines